The Culture of Building (Oxford University Press) is a 2006 book by Howard Davis, a professor of architecture at the University of Oregon. It describes how buildings throughout the ages and varied settings are products of a building culture – the "coordinated system of knowledge, rules, procedures, and habit that surrounds the building process in a given place and time". Davis suggests that this culture is a cross-global phenomenon in which thousands of buildings are produced through shared and predictable methods of working.

Notes

Bibliography

2006 non-fiction books
Architecture books
Vernacular architecture
Oxford University Press books
Indigenous architecture